Pushya   is the 8th lunar mansion or nakshatra in the Nakshatra series as used in Hindu astronomy and astrology in the constellation of Cancer. It is often called the star of norisment. The nakshatra extends from 3 degrees 20 minutes to 16 degrees 40 minutes of Karka (Cancer). It is owned by Shani and governed by  Bṛhaspati, priest of the gods. 
It is symbolyzed by Cow's udder, lotus, arrow and circle. If someone is born while Chandra (The Moon) is positioned within the Indian zodiac: 3°20' -16°40' Karka, then he / she belongs to Pusha nakshatra and deserves to experience Shani's maha dasha.

References

Cancer (constellation)
Nakshatra